Trade unions in South Sudan first emerged in the period prior to the country's independence with the formation of the Southern Sudan Workers Trade Union in August 2010.

List of unions in South Sudan
Employers Association of South Sudan (EASS)
South Sudan Workers Trade Union Federation (SSWTUF)
South Sudan Women Union (SSWU)

Trade union rights
The situation of trade unions rights in South Sudan is currently classified as one of the worst in the world, with a complete breakdown in the rule of law. In 2019, the, President of the South Sudan Workers Trade Union Federation (SSWTUF), Simone Deng, was murdered while on a trade union mission.

References

Trade unions in Africa